Trembling aspen is the popular name for either:

Populus tremuloides (American)
Populus tremula (Eurasian)

Other uses:
Trembling aspen (Konya), a tree in Turkey registered as a national natural monument